Reha Mota is a village in Bhuj Taluka of Kutch at a distance of about 15 km from Bhuj town, the capital of Kachchh District of Gujarat in India.

History
Reha is one of the 18 villages founded by Mistri community of Kutch in late 12th century.  These group of warriors were also skilled architects and have contributed to the erection of many historical monuments of Kutch.

During the years of laying of Railway lines in British India around 1850-1930 many members of Mistris moved out and made themselves into big railway contractors throughout British India. Some entered into the coal mines business. The Mistris of these villages have built and developed the old infrastructure around the villages in late 1890 from their earnings during those time. However, majority of old houses of Mistris with unique architect were destroyed in the earthquake of 26 January 2001.

Temples

Kuldevi Temples of many clans of these Kutch Gurjar Kshatriya community & Popat (Thakkar) family are also there in this village. Kuldevi Temple of Kamdhajiya branch of Rathor clan of Kutch Gurjar Kshatriyas is located in Reha village.
Kuldevi Temple of Shri Hansvahini Bhramani Mata of Chauhan clan of Kutch Gurjar Kshitriyas is located in Reha village

About Village

Reha village has at present two residing blocks one known as Moti Reha and other as Nana Reha or Chhota Reha.  Reha is famous for knife making from over a century.

There are Ramayana reliefs in the village.

References

Villages in Kutch district